is a railway station on the Hankyu Kyoto Line located in Higashiyodogawa-ku, Osaka Prefecture, Japan.  It is one of two nearest stations to Osaka University of Economics as well as Zuiko Yonchome Station on the Osaka Metro Imazatosuji Line.

Layout
The station has two elevated side platforms serving a track each, over Japan National Route 479. Ticket gates are located in the north and the south. "Kami-Shinjo Hankyu Building" is close to the south gates.
Opened as a ground-level station in 1916, it was elevated in 1975 shifting platforms in the direction of Kyoto, and removing the level crossing on Japan National Route 479 (then Osaka Municipal Road Shinjo Yamatogawa Route).

Stations next to Kami-Shinjō

History 
Kami-Shinjo station opened on 28 January 1916.

Station numbering was introduced to all Hankyu stations on 21 December 2013 with this station being designated as station number HK-64.

Future plans 
Construction is underway for grade separation. Work is being done as of 2019 to elevate a  section of the Kyoto Line south of this station towards Sōzenji Station. Originally planned to be opened by 2020, various delays have resulted in the opening being pushed to 2031.

References

External links
 Kami-Shinjō Station from Hankyu Railway website

Hankyu Kyoto Main Line
Higashiyodogawa-ku, Osaka
Railway stations in Osaka
Railway stations in Japan opened in 1928